Parada do Monte is a former civil parish in the municipality of Melgaço in the Viana do Castelo District, Portugal. In 2013, the parish merged into the new parish Parada do Monte e Cubalhão. It has a population of 487 inhabitants and a total area of 27.32 km2.

References

Freguesias of Melgaço, Portugal